Yashir Islame Pinto (born Yashir Armando Pinto Islame, 6 February 1991) is a professional footballer who plays as a right winger for club Universidad de Concepción and the Palestine national team.

Born in Chile, Islame represented his native country at youth level between 2009 and 2011. He switched allegiance to Palestine in 2016, when he made his senior debut.

Club career
He was born Santiago, Chile. Islame made his professional debut in Primera División de Chile on 28 June 2008 in an away match against Deportes Melipilla where Colo-Colo won 2–0. His first goal was against Fernandez Vial in the Colo-Colo victory of 4–2 in a match corresponding to the 2008 Copa Chile.

On 24 February 2012, Islame was loaned to FC Edmonton of the North American Soccer League on a season-long loan.

On 14 July 2021, he signed for newly promoted Khon Kaen United.

In 2022 he joined the team Negeri Sembilan FC on a free transfer. Has been with the team for half a year and has become a key player throughout 2022. He has helped the team secure fourth place in the Malaysia Super League in 2022. It is an impressive achievement as the team has just been promoted from the Malaysia Premier League in the previous year and had shocked the other Malaysia Super League teams as Negeri Sembilan FC was considered an underdog team. He has made 14 appearances and scored 2 goals during his time with Negeri Sembilan FC.

International career
Islame was included in the Chile squad that played against Mexico in the Estadio Azteca on 16 May 2010, replacing the injured Esteban Paredes.

In 2016, while playing in Curicó Unido, Islame made his debut for the Palestinian national team. He was selected in Palestine's squad for the 2018 FIFA World Cup qualification match against Timor-Leste on 29 March 2016. Islame scored two goals in his debut.

Personal life 
He is of Palestinian descent through his maternal grandfather. In 2018 he officially reordered the sequence of his last names (Pinto Islame to Islame Pinto), while suppressing his second forename (Armando).

Career statistics

International 
Scores and results list Palestine's goal tally first.

Honours
Colo-Colo
 Primera División de Chile: 2008 Clausura, 2009 Clausura

Melaka United
 Malaysia Premier League: 2016

Coquimbo Unido
 Primera B de Chile: 2018

References

External links
 
 

1991 births
Living people
Footballers from Santiago
Citizens of the State of Palestine through descent
Palestinian footballers
Palestine international footballers
Palestinian expatriate footballers
Chilean footballers
Chile youth international footballers
Chile under-20 international footballers
Chilean expatriate footballers
Chilean people of Palestinian descent
Colo-Colo footballers
Ñublense footballers
FC Edmonton players
Lota Schwager footballers
A.C. Barnechea footballers
Újpest FC players
Curicó Unido footballers
Melaka United F.C. players
Perak F.C. players
Coquimbo Unido footballers
PKNP FC players
PS Barito Putera players
Rangers de Talca footballers
Yashir Islame
Negeri Sembilan FA players
Negeri Sembilan FC players
Chilean Primera División players
North American Soccer League players
Primera B de Chile players
Nemzeti Bajnokság I players
Malaysia Super League players
Malaysia Premier League players
Liga 1 (Indonesia) players
Yashir Islame
Chilean expatriate sportspeople in Canada
Chilean expatriate sportspeople in Hungary
Chilean expatriate sportspeople in Malaysia
Chilean expatriate sportspeople in Indonesia
Chilean expatriate sportspeople in Thailand
Palestinian expatriate sportspeople in Chile
Palestinian expatriate sportspeople in Malaysia
Palestinian expatriate sportspeople in Indonesia
Palestinian expatriate sportspeople in Thailand
Expatriate soccer players in Canada
Expatriate footballers in Hungary
Expatriate footballers in Chile
Expatriate footballers in Malaysia
Expatriate footballers in Indonesia
Expatriate footballers in Thailand
Association football forwards
2019 AFC Asian Cup players